SSVM may refer to:

 Servants of the Lord and the Virgin of Matará, the female branch of the Institute of the Incarnate Word, Catholic religious order.
 Sundari Devi Saraswati Vidya Mandir, a residential school in India.
Structured Support-vector machine, a type of SVM, a supervised learning models of machine learning algorithms.